Viktor Andrén (born 17 February 1994) is a Swedish professional ice hockey goaltender. He is currently playing with Almtuna IS of the HockeyAllsvenskan (Allsv).

Playing career
Born in Mariestad, Sweden, Andrén played junior hockey, with local team Mariestad BoIS. In 2009–10, he debuted at the under-16 level, playing eight games in the J16 SM. He also competed with a regional all-star team from Västergötland in the annual TV-pucken, an under-15 national tournament. The following season he dressed for 27 U-18 games and moved on to Mariestad BoIS's U20 team. In 2011–12, after impressive performance in the youth ranks, Andrén was promoted to Mariestad BoIS's senior squad where he made his debut in the Swedish Hockeyettan. After a three-year stint at Mariestad BoIS, Andrén signed with Växjö Lakers. 

After playing for Växjö Lakers's U20 team for two seasons, Andrén signed with IK Pantern. In 2014–15, Andrén played 33 games for IK Pantern, and became a significant contributor to the team's promotion to the HockeyAllsvenskan. Andrén left IK Pantern after the 2015–16 season, playing 34 games and finishing with a 2.17 GAA and .922 save percentage. In 2016–17, Andrén made his Swedish Hockey League debut.

Andrén played four seasons with the Växjö Lakers before leaving the club out of contract to sign a two-year deal with Brynäs IF on 27 March 2020.

Career statistics

Awards and honours

References

External links

1994 births
Living people
Almtuna IS players
Brynäs IF players
IK Pantern players
Växjö Lakers players
Swedish ice hockey goaltenders